The Woodland Trust is the largest woodland conservation charity in the United Kingdom and is concerned with the creation, protection, and restoration of native woodland heritage. It has planted over 50 million trees since 1972.

The Woodland Trust has three aims: to protect ancient woodland which is rare, unique and irreplaceable, to promote the restoration of damaged ancient woodland, and to plant native trees and woods to benefit people and wildlife.

The Woodland Trust maintains ownership of over 1,000 sites covering over 24,700 hectares (247 km2). Of this, 8,070ha (33%) is ancient woodland. It ensures public access to its woods.

History

The charity was founded in Devon, England in 1972 by retired farmer and agricultural machinery dealer Kenneth Watkins.

The Trust's first purchase was part of the Avon Valley Woods, near Kingsbridge, Devon. By 1977 it had 22 woods in six counties. In 1978 it relocated to Grantham in Lincolnshire and announced an expansion of its activities across the UK. In 1984, Balmacaan Wood next to Loch Ness became the Trust's first Scottish acquisition.

From 2005 to 2008 it co-operated with the BBC for their Springwatch programme and the BBC's Breathing Places series of events held at woods. It continues to work with Springwatch and Autumnwatch, most recently in 2015 as part of the Big Spring Watch, which encouraged viewers to record the signs of nature (phenology) through the Trust's Nature's Calendar project.

Sites 
, the Woodland Trust had over 80 woods in Scotland, covering .

In Wales, it acquired the  Coed Lletywalter in Snowdonia National Park in 1980. In 2016, it had over 100 woods in Wales.

Work started in Northern Ireland in 1996 when the charity received a grant from the Millennium Commission to set up over 50 community woods in a scheme called Woods on Your Doorstep.

Headquarters
Its first employee and director, John James, came from Lincolnshire and was living in Nottingham at the time. It had a small office in Grantham, Lincolnshire. James was chief executive from 1992 to 1997, and then Michael Townsend from 1997 to 2004, Sue Holden from 2004 to 2014 and Beccy Speight from 2014 to 2019. The current chief executive is Darren Moorcroft.

The building, designed by Feilden Clegg Bradley Studios as architect and Atelier One as structural engineer, incorporates light shelves to distribute natural daylight around the 200 workstations, and concrete panels to absorb daytime heat, to provide the thermal mass that the lightweight wooden structure would otherwise lack. It is estimated that compared to a concrete framed construction, the timber structure saved the equivalent in carbon production as nine years of the building's operation.

Structure
The Woodland Trust's Head Office is located in Grantham in South Kesteven, south Lincolnshire, with regional offices across the UK. It employs around 300 people at its Grantham headquarters. Its current president is Clive Anderson since 2003. In 2016 Barbara Young, Baroness Young of Old Scone became the charity's Chair.

Funding
The Woodland Trust receives funding from a wide range of sources including membership, legacies, donations and appeals, corporate supporters, grants and charitable trusts including lottery funding, other organisations and landfill tax.

Function
The Woodland Trust uses its experience and authority in conservation to influence others who are in a position to improve the future of native woodland. This includes government, other landowners, and like-minded organisations. It also campaigns to protect and save ancient woodland from destructive development. Its projects also include the Nature Detectives youth programme, a project for schools learning about the seasonal effect on woodlands – phenology – and the Ancient Tree Hunt campaign.

Woodland protection
It looks after more than 1,000 woods and groups of woods covering . Nearly 350 of its sites contain ancient woodland of which 70 per cent is semi-natural ancient woodland – land which has been under tree cover since at least 1600. It also manages over 110 Sites of Special Scientific Interest. There are currently over 600 ancient woods under threat across the UK.

Woodland creation
The trust has also created new woodlands: over  have been created, including 250 new community woods in England, Wales and Northern Ireland. It owns 20 sites covering  in the National Forest and has twelve sites in Community Forests in England.

The Woodland Trust also provides free trees to communities or places of education in order to facilitate the creation of new woodland.

Completed projects

Millennium woods
The Woodland Trust's Woods on Your Doorstep project created 250 "Millennium woods" to celebrate the millennium.

Trafalgar Woods 
As part of the trust's 'Tree For All' campaign, new woods were planted to mark the 2005 anniversary of the Battle of Trafalgar, notably Victory Wood in Kent.

Jubilee Woods

The Trust ran the Jubilee Woods project, which aimed to plant 6 million trees and create 60 commemorative 'Diamond' woods across the UK as part of Queen Elizabeth II's Diamond Jubilee celebrations in 2012. The largest of these, owned and managed by the Trust itself, is the Flagship Diamond Wood within the National Forest in Leicestershire, which will be planted with 300,000 trees.

First World War Centenary Woods 
Beginning in 2014, a project commemorating the First World War involved tree planting and the establishment of new woodland sites across the UK. The planned sites were Langley Vale Wood (England), Dreghorn Woods (Scotland), Coed Ffos Las (Wales), and Brackfield Wood (Northern Ireland).

As part of the project, the Woodland Trust entered a partnership with the National Football Museum to create team groves to commemorate all the professional football players involved in the First World War, giving supporters the chance to dedicate trees at the English Centenary Wood, Langley Vale in Epsom.

Ongoing initiatives

Nature's Calendar 
This citizen science project encourages members of the public to record the signs of the seasons near to them in order to show and assess the impact of climate change on the UK's wildlife. Thousands of volunteers send in their sightings, providing evidence about how wildlife is responding to the changing climate.

The Trust's records date back to 1736, making it the longest written biological record of its kind. It has become a powerful tool in assessing the impact of climate change and is valued by research scientists.

Ancient Tree Inventory
The Ancient Tree Inventory is a project run by the Woodland Trust in partnership with the Tree Register and the Ancient Tree Forum, which aims to record ancient, veteran and notable trees in the United Kingdom. , over 180,000 trees have been recorded by members of the public on the project's website, which provides a map of the trees.

Woods

Woods that the trust owns and looks after include:

England

 Denge Wood, Kent
 Dick Buck's Burrows, Cromer, Norfolk
 Folke Wood, Dorset
 Friezland Wood, Kent
 Garratts Wood, Somerset
 Great Wood, Felbrigg Estate, Norfolk
 Hack Fall Wood, North Yorkshire
 Heartwood Forest, Hertfordshire
 Joyden's Wood, Kent
 Lineover Wood SSSI, Gloucestershire
 Oxmoor Copse, Surrey
 Philipshill Wood, Buckinghamshire
 Pretty Corner Wood, Sheringham, Norfolk
 Skipton Wood, North Yorkshire
 Tarn Wadling, Cumbria
 Uffmoor Wood, Worcestershire
 Warren Wood, Norfolk
 Whittaker Wood, Greater Manchester
 Whittlewood Forest, Northamptonshire
 Weybourne Wood, Weybourne, Norfolk
 West Runton, West Runton, Norfolk
 Wychwood, Oxfordshire

Scotland
 Backmuir Wood, Angus
 Glen Finglas Estate, the Trossachs

Wales 
 Coed Felinrhyd & Llennyrch
 Coed Ffos Las

Northern Ireland 
 Brackfield Wood
 Monkstown Wood

See also
 Forestry in the United Kingdom
 Forestry Commission
 The Big Tree Plant
 The Tree Council
 The Tree Register

References

External links

 
 

 
Nature conservation organisations based in the United Kingdom
Environmental charities based in the United Kingdom
Forests and woodlands of England
Organisations based in Lincolnshire
Environmental organizations established in 1972
1972 establishments in the United Kingdom
South Kesteven District